Promode Chandra Gogoi (29 September 1930 – 6 April 2012) was an Indian politician from the state of Assam. He was a member of the Legislative Assembly of Assam for five terms, and also served as the Minister for Flood control & Irrigation of the state from 1996 till 2001.

Early life
Gogoi was born in the Sibsagar district of Upper Assam.

Political career
Promode was associated with the All India Students Federation during his student days. He joined the Communist Party of India (CPI) in 1948 and was elected to the state assembly of Assam from Sibsagar constituency for the first time in 1967.

He was a member of the central secretariat of the CPI and was reappointed to its national executive days before his death at the Patna congress of the party. He was also the President of the All India Trade Union Congress and Vice-President of the World Federation of Trade Unions.

Death
After experiencing epistaxis, he was admitted to the Guwahati Neurological Research Centre (GNRC) on 2 April 2012. His condition worsened as he suffered a stroke and subsequently, the doctors declared him dead. He remained a bachelor and was survived by granddaughter Purabi Gogoi, a civil servant.

References

1930 births
2012 deaths
Assam MLAs 1967–1972
Assam MLAs 1972–1978
Assam MLAs 1978–1983
Assam MLAs 1991–1996
Assam MLAs 1996–2001
Communist Party of India politicians from Assam
People from Sivasagar